A Girl Like Me: Letters to My Lovers is an extended play by American singer-songwriter and drag queen Peppermint. It was released on October 16, 2020 by Producer Entertainment Group and distributed by Warner's Alternative Distribution Alliance. A Girl Like Me is the first of a trilogy of EPs, with the second installment, Moment of Weakness: Letters to My Lovers, released on April 22, 2022. The lead single from the EP, "Best Sex", was released on October 2, 2020. The EP was also released alongside a short film of the same name. A remix ep called Letters (The Remixes) was released on April 16, 2021.

The EP garnered Peppermint a nomination for Outstanding Music Artist at the 2021 GLAAD Media Awards.

Background
Peppermint originally planned to release a full studio album in May 2020, and issued the lead single for the project, "What You're Looking For" on February 14, 2020. However, in an interview with Entertainment Tonight on August 28, 2020, Peppermint announced that the project would in fact be a trilogy of EPs, with A Girl Like Me: Letters to My Lovers being the first in the series.

Composition and themes
The album has been described as "her most personal music yet". Peppermint has said "it really does focus on my life -- who I am as a trans woman -- and everything that's happening right now [with] Black Lives Matter, Black Trans Lives Matter and a lot of the issues that we are dealing with socially." The EPs will feature collaborations with Laith Ashley, Jerome Bell, Daniel Shevlin of Well-Strung, Matt Katz-Bohen of Blondie, Corey Tut and Adam Joseph.

"Best Sex" has been described as "channel[ing] the sensuality of 90s R&B along with a dash of Vangelis-type electronica".

Track listing

Personnel
Credits adapted from Tidal.

Peppermint – lead vocals
Adam Joseph – backing vocals
Laith Ashley – featured vocals
Daniel Shevlin – cello
Matt Katz-Bohen – guitar, piano
Brian Flores – guitar
Justin Goldner – bass
Randy Schrager – drums
Andee Blacksugar – guitar
Ansy Francois – horns
Chip Tingle – horns
Scott Englebright – horns
Electropoint – mixing and mastering

Release history

References

2020 EPs
Albums postponed due to the COVID-19 pandemic
Peppermint (entertainer) albums
Producer Entertainment Group albums
Transgender-related music
Contemporary R&B EPs
Pop music EPs
Visual albums
LGBT-related albums